Reese and the Smooth Ones is a 1969 album by the Art Ensemble of Chicago recorded in Paris for the French BYG Actuel label. It features performances by Lester Bowie, Joseph Jarman, Roscoe Mitchell and Malachi Favors Maghostut.

Reception
The Allmusic review by Scott Yanow awarded the album 3 stars noting that "The episodic music continually holds one's interest, and overall, it makes a unified (if unpredictable) statement".

Track listing
 "Reese Part 1 / The Smooth Ones Part 1" - 20:02
 "Reese Part 2 / The Smooth Ones Part 2" - 20:57
"Reese" composed by Roscoe Mitchell
"The Smooth Ones" composed by Lester Bowie
Recorded August 12, 1969 in Paris

Personnel
Lester Bowie: trumpet, percussion instruments
Malachi Favors Maghostut: bass, percussion instruments, vocals
Joseph Jarman: saxophones, clarinets, percussion instruments
Roscoe Mitchell: saxophones, clarinets, flute, percussion instruments

References

1969 albums
BYG Actuel albums
Art Ensemble of Chicago albums